Krisztina Molnár (born 8 April 1976 in Budapest) is a former Hungarian athlete specializing in the pole vault. She competed at two consecutive Summer Olympics, first at the 2004 Athens Games, then at the 2008 Beijing Games, both times failing to qualify for the final. Her outdoor personal best of 4.55 metres achieved in 2006 is still the Hungarian record. She also has an indoor best of 4.50 metres from 2006.

She also competed in six events at the 1992 Summer Olympics in gymnastics, when she was 16 years old.

Competition record

References

External links
 IAAF profile

1976 births
Living people
Hungarian female pole vaulters
Athletes (track and field) at the 2004 Summer Olympics
Athletes (track and field) at the 2008 Summer Olympics
Olympic athletes of Hungary
Athletes from Budapest
Hungarian female artistic gymnasts
Olympic gymnasts of Hungary
Gymnasts at the 1992 Summer Olympics
Gymnasts from Budapest